Edward Henry Lewinski Corwin (1885–1953) was a New York City-based author of historical books, Polish activist and physician who worked in the public health sector of the city and state, publishing several reports and other works.
He received Ph. D degree at the Columbia University .

During World War I he was  the Secretary of the American Polish Relief Committee. He also published several letters and statements in New York Times on behalf of Polish community in United States and plight of Poland.
In 1917, he published "The Political History of Poland", a 624-page work about Poland. His work was reviewed by Robert J. Kerner in The American Historical Review, Vol.23, No 4 (July 1918), published by American Historical Association . His book received several praises;

The Dial: A Fortnightly named it in 1919 the best and most authoritative brief history of Poland now on the market.

Albert Edward McKinley in Collected Materials for the Study of the War  names it well illustrated, most useful for period since partition

A Guide to Historical Literature by William Henry Allison, George Matthew Dutcher published by American Library Association described it as extraordinary medley of sound observations, picturesque quotations from the sources

Besides praises and reviews, the book is used in several historical publications such as
The Middle Ages by Edward Maslin Hulme  
Europe, 1789-1920 by Edward Raymond Turner 
World Political Geography by George Etzel Pearcy, Russell Hunt Fifield 
History of Europe, Ancient and Medieval by James Henry Breasted, James Harvey Robinson 
A Guide to the Study of Medieval History by Louis John Paetow
Russia and Eastern Europe, 1789-1985 by Raymond Pearson

His other book connected to history of Poles was Poles in America: Polish Committee of "America's Making" published in 1921 .

During World War I he described the situation of German-occupied Poland in the following words:
      The weeping willow weeps no more-it is now being cut down to make fires

"Poles in need of help" The New York Times December 1915

References 

1885 births
1953 deaths
American male non-fiction writers
American public health doctors
American people of Polish descent
20th-century American historians
20th-century American male writers